Muhammad Ali visited India on multiple occasions to participate in exhibition boxing matches, to visit schools and orphanages supported by his foundation, and for other private visits.

Exhibition boxing
In January 1980 Muhammad Ali visited India, reportedly at the behest of Rajiv Gandhi, to participate in exhibition boxing matches in Delhi, Bombay, and Chennai.

Delhi
In Delhi, on January 27, 1980, Ali sparred with Kaur Singh, the Indian national heavyweight champion, for a four-round exhibition match. More than 50,000 people attended the match. According to Kaur Singh: 

A veteran journalist who witnessed the fight claimed that Ali hardly threw any punches at Kaur Singh during the match, spending the time chit-chatting with youngsters who had collected around the ring.

Madras
Ali came to Madras and held hands with MGR. Crowds thronged Chennai's Nehru stadium to witness the legend in action in 1980. Organised by Tamil Nadu State Amateur Boxing Association and Apeejay, the exhibition bout that saw Ali taking on former heavy weight champion Jimmy Ellis.

Social interactions in India
According to a February 1980 report published in The Telegraph: 
In a press conference organized in Bombay in January 1980, Ali stated: "I am happy to be in Bombay; I was driving here from the airport and came via Muhammad Ali Road—you have already named a road after me."

References

India
Boxing in India